The St. Joseph Cathedral Also Ciudad Guzmán Cathedral It is a Catholic cathedral in Mexico that serves as the mother church of the Roman Catholic Diocese of Ciudad Guzmán and the seat of its bishop. Built at the end of the 19th century, it was completed around 1900.

The current cathedral was built in 1866. The first stone was laid on May 27, 1866, by the then parish priest, Antonio Zuniga Ibarra. It was consecrated on October 8, 1900.

See also
Roman Catholicism in Mexico
St. Joseph's Cathedral

References

Roman Catholic cathedrals in Mexico
Roman Catholic churches completed in 1866
19th-century Roman Catholic church buildings in Mexico